West Bandung Regency is a landlocked regency of West Java. It was established in 2007, formerly it was part of Bandung Regency.  The capital of this new regency is Ngamprah, an industrial district on the west side of Bandung.  It is part of the Bandung Metropolitan Area.

The area of the regency is 1,305.77 km2 and the population was 1,506,448 at the 2010 Census and 1,788,336 at the 2020 Census. The official estimate as at mid 2021 was 1,814,226.

History
The idea of dividing Bandung Regency into two separate regencies originated in 1999, based on a proposal from the current regent (H.U. Hatta Djati Permana) for the parliament to consider and approve the idea of splitting off the western part of the existing Bandung Regency. 
Before the split-off was successfully completed, the Bandung suburb of Cimahi (an area consisting of three districts, which used to be part of Bandung Regency) had been promoted to become an autonomous city. After Cimahi became an autonomous administration, the request to split off the western portion of Bandung Regency as a separate regency grew.

Finally in 2007, the government of Indonesia approved the proposal to separate the western part of Bandung Regency to become a separate regency, the West Bandung Regency.
On its birth, this newest regency in West Java were headed by an appointed acting regent H. Tjatja Kuswara (an officer from West Java provincial government) until April 2008, when the first direct election of West Bandung Regency Regent was held, with H. Abubakar and H. Agus Yasmin as the contestants; H. Abubakar with his running mate Ernawan Natasaputra won the election and became the Regent and Vice-Regent of West Bandung Regency.

Administration
West Bandung Regent currently is Hengky Kurniawan.

Administrative Districts
At the time of the 2010 Census, West Bandung Regency was divided into fifteen districts (kecamatan), but subsequently a sixteenth district (Saguling) was created by the division of the existing Batujajar District. Parongpong and Lembang Districts lie immediately north of Bandung city, and contain many suburbs of the city. The districts (which each bears the name of the town which is its administrative centre) are all listed below with their areas and their populations at the 2010 Census and the 2020 Census, together with the official estimates as at mid 2021. The table also includes the number of administrative villages (rural desa and urban kelurahan) in each district.
 

Note: (a) the figure for the new Saguling District is included in the figure given for the Batujajar District, from which it was split off.

Tourism
International/Local tourist location is:
 Mount Tangkuban Parahu, famous mountain in Indonesia with its 4 craters. Vehicles can arrive to the lips of the biggest crater (Kawah Ratu means Queen of the Craters). Some craters can be also hiked.
Local tourist locations are:
 Lembang, northeasternmost district of this regency, is well known for fresh air.
 Maribaya, east of Lembang, an area with fresh air and a waterfall.
 Curug Cimahi, beautiful 85 metres waterfall located near the district of Parongpong, near Cihideung Village and Vila Istana Bunga, 687 stairs to the waterfall. A location for the 10th leg of eco-tourism destination of US TV series, The Amazing Race 23.
 Ciwangun Indah Camp, a 22 hectares outbound area mainly for children is located in Colonel Masturi street, Ciwangun, Cihanjuang Rahayu, Parongpong. The location consists of a waterfall, a man-made pond, pines forest, tea plantation and strawberry field.
 Curug Kebul, the tallest waterfall among 7 waterfalls in Curug Malela area.
 Curug Malela, a 70-meter wide and 50-meter tall waterfall at Manglid village, Cicadas sub-district, Rongga district, West Bandung Regency near Cianjur Regency consists of 5 waterfalls side by side and looked like a silky whitish curtain from afar, 87 kilometres from Bandung, 4 hours using a motorcycle. The waterfall is known also as 'Mini Niagara' can be seen since 1 kilometre away from a musholla and the neareast waterfall can be reached from a parking area.
 Karanghawu Vertical Cave, at Cidadap village, Padalarang district, near Ciburuy lake and 125 cliff, a 90 metres vertical cave with a natural bridge over it.
 Pawon Cave, at Cipatat, a pre-historic cave was used when Old Bandung Lake still exist.
 Situ Lembang, a remote small man-made lake, located between 2 mountains, mount Tangkubanparahu and mount Burangrang, it has a tremendous natural scenery and unpolluted remote fresh air. The location is a training camp for the Army, so not every time and everyone may access it.
 Stone Garden, a hill near Padalarang which needs a lot of energy to climb, is full of big stones or boulders, sometimes cloud through it and below the top of the hill, so the situation is like at Zhangjiajie Mountain in China.
 Waduk Saguling, a man-made lake formed by the Saguling Dam located in the centre of West Bandung Regency, also location of fishing activities. Located in the upper reaches of Citarum River.
 Waduk Cirata, a man-made lake and dam of Citarum River, located in Cipeundeuy district. Located between Waduk Saguling and Waduk Jatiluhur.
 Situ Ciburuy, a small lake, located on the side of the state road connecting Cianjur and Bandung.

Bandung Regency Administration will build information center at their leading sites, Maribaya, Situ Ciburuy and Pawon Cave.

Al Irsyad Mosque
The unique Al Irsyad Mosque received the fifth place award in the Building Of The Year 2010, and is located in Kota Baru Parahyangan with a capacity of 1,500 people. The mosque is box-shaped like the Ka'bah with grey colour, but it has many holes on its walls for ventilation and makes 2 sentences of shahada.

Industry
Several industries are located in this area :
 Indofood (Food)
 Otto (Medicine)
 Ultrajaya (Beverage)

Transport
West Bandung Regency position is between Jakarta and Bandung city. It is the place where 2 main state road (Jakarta-Puncak/Sukabumi-Bandung) and (Jakarta-Purwakarta-Bandung) and 2 railroad route (Jakarta-Bandung) and (Cianjur-Bandung) were merged. It also has a connection to other cities using the Jakarta-Bandung intercity highway, with its Padalarang Toll Gate.

It also has a major train station, the Padalarang railway station, where several economy-class intercity and domestic trains stop.

See also
 List of regencies and cities of Indonesia

References